, also known as Charcofil or  to their fans, is a Japanese male rock band. Its members are Takahiro Konagawa, Yuzo Otsuka, Yuki Yasui, and Shintaro Takano. They met each other and formed Charcoal Filter in their high school days. After graduation from high school, they came out with the song "I start again" in 1999. They are known for creating the song "Tightrope", used as the ending theme of the anime series Gensōmaden Saiyūki, back in 2000. From 2002 to 2004 they were produced by Seiji Kameda. They disbanded in 2007.

History 

In 1995 Konagawa, Yasui and Takano formed a band. The next year they incorporated Otsuka as a vocalist, and named the band Charcoal Filter. At first they played Green Day’s songs, which they like, and then they began to play their own songs composed by themselves.

In early 1999 they recorded several songs in New York City for debut. In September of the same year the indie album Gimme a light was released. Two months later they came out with the debut single I start again. The next year they created the song Tightrope, used as the ending theme of the anime series Gensōmaden Saiyūki.

The year 2002 the turning point in their career came. The eighth single Brand-New Myself ~Boku ni Dekiru Koto was a hit. Following this single, the album MADE IN Hi-High took the sixth place in weekly Oricon chart, as obtained them a reputation.

Members 
 Takahiro Konagawa (小名川高弘, B. November 30, 1979); Guitars, Background Vocals, and the Leader
 Yuzo Otsuka (大塚雄三, B. August 27, 1979); Vocals and Guitars
 Yuki Yasui (安井佑輝, B. March 5, 1980); Bass Guitars and Background Vocals
 Shintaro Takano (高野真太郎, B. October 20, 1979); Drums and Background Vocals

Discography

Singles 
 I start again
 November 1, 1999
 I start again
 Let’s go
 Nineteen

 Life goes on
 February 2, 2000
 Life goes on
 Single word
 Snow drive

 Don’t miss it
 May 17, 2000
 Don’t miss it
 Turning point

 Tightrope
 June 21, 2000
 Tightrope
 Tightrope -Medieval version-
 Tightrope -Instrumental version-

 Kizuna (絆, Bound of Friendship)
 March 9, 2001 (In-Kyūshū-Limited Single)
 Kizuna (絆, Bound of Friendship)
 Kizuna -Instrumental- (絆 -Instrumental-, Bound of Friendship -Instrumental-)
 The Go-Ahead Man

 Hajikeyō (はじけよう, Let’s Have Fun!)
 June 1, 2001
 Hajikeyō (はじけよう, Let’s Have Fun!)
 Jumpin’ high
 Libido (リビドー)

 Kodokuna Taiyō (孤独な太陽, A Lonely Sun)
 September 26, 2001
 Kodokuna Taiyō (孤独な太陽, A Lonely Sun)
 Communication
 La La (ララ)

 Sotsugyō (卒業, Graduation)
 January 30, 2002
 Sotsugyō (卒業, Graduation)
 Romantic (ロマンチック)
 Mother Blues

 Brand-New Myself ~Boku ni Dekiru Koto (Brand-New Myself ~僕にできること, Brand-New Myself ~What I Can Do)
 May 1, 2002
 Brand-New Myself ~Boku ni Dekiru Koto (Brand-New Myself ~僕にできること, Brand-New Myself ~What I Can Do)
 2,000 Light Years Away
 Brand-New Myself ~Boku ni Dekiru Koto (instrumental) (Brand-New Myself ~僕にできること (instrumental), Brand-New Myself ~What I Can Do (instrumental))

 White winter song
 December 11, 2002
 White winter song
 WOW WOW PARADISE (WOW WOW パラダイス)
 Sotsugyō ~Okuru Koto Version~ (卒業 ~贈ることバージョン~, Graduation ~Giving Word Version~)
 White winter song ~Instrumental~

 Yasashisa Licence / BY MY SIDE (やさしさライセンス, Licence of a Tenderness / BY MY SIDE)
 May 21, 2003
 Yasashisa Licence (やさしさライセンス, Licence of a Tenderness)
 BY MY SIDE
 Yasashisa Licence -Instrumental- (やさしさライセンス -Instrumental-, Licence of a Tenderness -Instrumental-)
 BY MY SIDE -Instrumental-

 Niji (虹, Rainbow)
 August 6, 2003
 Niji (虹, Rainbow)
 Beautiful Sandy (ビューティフルサンディー)
 Niji -Instrumental- (虹 -Instrumental-, Rainbow -Instrumental-)
 Beautiful Sandy -Instrumental- (ビューティフルサンディー -Instrumental-)

 one Days (A Small Part of My Days)
 July 22, 2004
 one Days (A Small Part of My Days)
 Kiss on the beach
 one Days -Instrumental- (A Small Part of My Days -Instrumental-)
 Kiss on the beach -Instrumental-
 Hidden Track: Kane ga Nai (金がない, I Have No Money)

 Hitori ja Totemo Aruke nai Sekai no Ue de (一人じゃとても歩けない世界の上で, On the World that I Can’t Possibly Walk Alone)
 June 7, 2006
 Hitori ja Totemo Aruke nai Sekai no Ue de (一人じゃとても歩けない世界の上で, On the World that I Can’t Possibly Walk Alone)
 Motto (もっと, More)
 Arigatō (ありがとう, Thank you)

Albums

DVDs 
 CHARCOAL FILTER MEN SOUL
 January 1, 2003

 Waku Waku Charcoal Fair 2003 o Charcoal Filter to Miru DVD
 わくわくチャコールフェア2003をチャコールフィルターと観るDVD
 Let’s See The Exciting Charcoal Fair 2003 with Charcoal Filter!
 February 21, 2004

 Waku Waku Charcoal Fair 2004 o Charcoal Filter to You DVD わくわくチャコールフェア2004をチャコールフィルターと酔うDVD
 Let’s Enjoy The Exciting Charcoal Fair 2004 with Charcoal Filter!
 March 18, 2005

 5th Anniversary Special Live Party at Shibuya O-East March 18, 2005

 Waku Waku Charcoal Fair 2005 わくわくチャコールフェア2005
 The Exciting Charcoal Fair 2005
 March 18, 2006

 "2006 Kokoro no Yuku Michi''" Tour Final 2006.5.27 SHIBUYA CLUB QUATTRO
 「2006 心の行く道」ツアーファイナル 2006.5.27 SHIBUYA CLUB QUATTRO
 The Way of My Soul 2006 Tour Final on May 27, 2006 at Shibuya Club Quattro
 July 15, 2006

 Concert history 

Charcoal Filter often give a live concert. They have played all Japanese prefectures. Their performance is appreciated by their own generation. Also, Konagawa and Otsuka appeared at well-known Japanese musical event Dream Power John Lennon Super Live back in 2003.

 Spiky night (July - August, 2000)
 Spread out GIG 20-21 (November, 2000 - January, 2001)
 "弾" 前哨戦 in ライヴハウス (Precedent Tour to Dan, April, 2001)
 Spark out GIG "弾" (Spark out GIG Dan, June, 2001)
 PANIC POP TOUR (January, 2002)
 B.N.M. 02 (July - August, 2002)
 Made in TOUR & TOUR the Hi-High (November, 2002)
 スプリンターツアー (Sprinter Tour, February - April, 2003)
 わくわくチャコールフェア2003 (The Exciting Charcoal Fair 2003, April, 2003)
 Hallin’ Love (July - August, 2003)
 KINGDOM後夜祭 (Final Festival of Kingdom, November, 2003)
 スプリンターツアー2 ~Happy Set~ (Sprinter Tour 2 ~Happy Set~, December, 2003 - March, 2004)
 わくわくチャコールフェア2004 (The Exciting Charcoal Fair 2004, April, 2004)
 スプリンターツアー2 ファイナル 47都道府県ワンマン制覇記念ライヴ (Sprinter Tour 2 Final Memorial Concert of Touring All Around Japan, April, 2004)
 Re: HOME (October, 2004)
 5th Anniversary Special Live Party (October, 2004)
 ジュポ～ンツアー (Jupōn Tour, December, 2004)
 Japan tour, 47 (March - July, 2005)
 わくわくチャコールフェア2005 (The Exciting Charcoal Fair 2005, April, 2005)
 Gimme a night (June - August, 2005)
 Gimme a 2006 The 忘年会 (Gimme a 2006 The Year-End Party'', December, 2005)
 わくわくチャコールフェア2006 (The Exciting Charcoal Fair 2006, April, 2006)
 2006 心の行く道 (The Way of My Soul 2006, May, 2006)

External links 
Official Web Sites
 Official Web Site by Nippon Crown 
 Official Web Site of Daiji Music 
 Serial Essay by Konagawa 
 Serial Essay by Otsuka 
 Serial Essay by Yasui & Takano 

Private Web Sites
 BURNING 

Japanese rock music groups
Musical groups from Tokyo